Omegna is a comune (municipality) in the Province of Verbano-Cusio-Ossola in the Italian region Piedmont, located about  northeast of Turin and about  southwest of Verbania at the northernmost point of Lago d’Orta and traversed by the Nigoglia, the lake's sole outflow.

A lively street market is held every Thursday morning along the lakeside boulevard.  A daily ferry service connects Omegna with towns and villages around the lake.

History

The presence of ancient settlements in the area has been proved by excavations held in the frazione of Cireggio, archaeological findings dating from the late Bronze and Iron Ages. Omegna is mentioned in 1221 AD, when the population gave itself to the commune of Novara.

In the 19th and early 20th century, it became an industrial centre that was for many years the primary Italian production centre for pots and small home appliances in Italy; the population was contemporaneously increased by immigrants. In 1913 Omegna was connected with Pallanza by an electrical tramway line. It was declared a city in 1939. During World War II it was a centre of partisan resistance against the German-Fascist occupation.

Main sights

Church of Sant'Ambrogio. It is a late-Romanesque building with a nave and two aisles, with side chapels. The bell tower is still mostly the medieval one. The interior is now in Baroque style and houses an altarpiece by Fermo Stella da Caravaggio (1547) and an urn with the relics of St. Vith, patron saint of Omegna.
Ponte Antico ("Ancient Bridge", 15th century), over the Strona river.
Porta della Valle ("Valley Gate", c. 1100 AD), also known as Porta Romana. It is the only surviving one among the five medieval gates of Omegna.
Museum of Arts and Industry Forum.

Twin towns
 Lodi, Lombardy

References

External links
 Official website

 
Populated places on Lake Orta